Buke may refer to:
 Buke (China), the practice of taking extra classes in secondary school
 Buke (Japan), a social class
 Buke, old variant of the word for "book"
 Buke, a district in Altenbeken, Germany
 Büke, a Turkish given name
 Buké, a talk show on the Hungarian TV channel Hír TV

See also 
 Buke and Gase, American musical duo
 Bûke baranê, a type of Kurdish doll
 Buki (disambiguation)